The gens Apustia was a plebeian family at Rome during the period of the Republic.  The first member of this gens who obtained the consulship was Lucius Apustius Fullo, in 226 BC.

Praenomina
The praenomina associated with the Apustiii included Lucius, Gaius, and Publius.

Branches and cognomina
The only significant branch of the Apustia gens at Rome bore the cognomen Fullo.  It was probably derived from the occupation of one of the Apustii, a cleaner of woolen cloths.

Members

 Gaius Apustius, grandfather of the consul of 226 BC.
 Lucius Apustius, father of the consul of 226 BC.
 Lucius Apustius L. f. C. n. Fullo, consul in 226 BC, prepared for a Gallic invasion.
 Lucius Apustius L. f. L. n. Fullo, praetor in 196 BC.
 Lucius Apustius, commander of the Roman troops at Tarentum in 215 BC.
 Lucius Apustius, legate of the consul Publius Sulpicius Galba in Macedonia during the war against Philip in 200 BC, and later of Lucius Cornelius Scipio in 190.
 Publius Apustius, one of the ambassadors sent to the younger Ptolemaeus in 161 BC.

See also
 List of Roman gentes

References

Roman gentes